Tetragonoderus notaphioides is a species of beetle in the family Carabidae. It was described by Victor Motschulsky in 1861.

References

notaphioides
Beetles described in 1861